There are a variety of LGBT social networking services. Grindr is the largest and best-known gay mobile app, and was one of the first when it launched in March 2009.

 Adam4Adam
 Atraf
 Blued
 DBNA
 Delta App
 dudesnude
 Fridae
 Gabile.com
 Gaydar
 Gays.com
 Grindr
 GuySpy
 Her
 Hornet
 Jack'd
 Manhunt
 PlanetRomeo
 Scruff
 Sniffies
 Squirt.org
 Taimi

Defunct 

 Chappy
 Compatible Partners
 Gay.com
 Gingerbeer
 Manjam.com
 MiFinder
 OUTeverywhere
 Rainbow Christians
 Trevvy

References

Social networking services

LGBT social networking services